Wood Lane was a station on the London Underground that was located in Shepherd's Bush, west London. It was opened in 1908 on the Hammersmith branch of the Metropolitan Railway (now the Hammersmith & City line), on the viaduct adjacent to the bridge over Wood Lane and close to a station of the same name but on the Central London Railway (now the Central line).

It was closed temporarily in 1914, reopened in 1920 and eventually closed permanently in 1959 at which time it was served by the Metropolitan line.

History

Exhibition station
The two Wood Lane stations were opened in 1908 to serve the Franco-British Exhibition and the 1908 Olympic Games in the area that was to become known as White City. The Metropolitan Railway's Wood Lane opened with the name Wood Lane (Exhibition) on 1 May 1908 and the Central London Railway's Wood Lane station opened on 14 May 1908. Both were intended to be temporary and to be closed after the exhibition and the Games. Wood Lane (Exhibition) station was closed on 31 October 1914, shortly after the outbreak of the First World War. The other Wood Lane became the permanent western terminus of the Central London Railway.

Reopening
The station was brought back into use on 5 November 1920, with the name Wood Lane (White City), but was open only when an exhibition or event was being staged.

It was served by the Metropolitan line and was between Shepherd's Bush and Latimer Road.

Final renaming and subsequent closure
The Central line's Wood Lane closed, and was replaced by White City station situated just to the north, on 23 November 1947. The Metropolitan line station changed its name to White City on the same date. It retained this name for the remainder of its existence.

Following a fire in which one of the wooden platforms was destroyed, the Metropolitan line White City station was permanently closed. It was last used on 24 October 1959, and the Television Centre complex now runs on both sides of the railway. The station at viaduct level was largely demolished; the ticket office at ground level remains and has been repainted, though is not visible from the street.

The entrance from Wood Lane (and a main entrance to the exhibitions) was situated along a road which no longer exists that ran approximately along the line of the entrance to the Television Centre multi-storey car park.  The centre point of the platforms was approximately opposite the largest of the BBC satellite dishes to the west of the line.

As part of the plans for the redevelopment of White City, a new Wood Lane station was built on the Hammersmith & City line.

Latimer Road & Acton Railway

The Latimer Road & Acton Railway (LR&AR), a nominally independent company, proposed a line linking the Hammersmith & City Railway at Wood Lane with the Great Western Railway east of their Acton station. The H&CR initially insisted that the LR&AR built a separate exchange station at Wood Lane, rather than using the existing platforms. The GWR wanted the LR&AR to also build a separate Acton station, and a house was demolished at Friar's Place for this.

The railway was authorised by act in 1882, but between 1885 and 1893 four acts for extensions of time were needed, as the LR&A Company could not reach agreement with the Great Western and the Metropolitan for joint-working of the line. When this was finally achieved (confirmed by act in 1895), capital could not be raised. The line was abandoned by act in 1900, after only small parts had been built, including an iron bridge (later demolished) over the North & South Western Junction Railway near the current Westway road bridge. The later Ealing & Shepherd's Bush Railway followed a similar route to the proposed LR&AR line, the Metropolitan ironically promoting a bill in 1912 to connect the Hammersmith & City to this line, which failed on opposition from the Great Western, the Central London Railway, and the District Railway.

References

External links 
  Wood Lane station, circa 1910

Disused London Underground stations
Former Hammersmith and City Railway stations
Railway stations in Great Britain opened in 1908
Railway stations in Great Britain closed in 1914
Railway stations in Great Britain opened in 1920
Railway stations in Great Britain closed in 1959
Shepherd's Bush
1908 establishments in England

ru:Вуд-лэйн (станция метро)